Klemen Grošelj (born 8 March 1976) is a Slovenian politician of the Freedom Movement (GS) who has been serving as a Member of the European Parliament since 2019.

Grošelj has since been serving on the Committee on Foreign Affairs. In this capacity, he is his parliamentary group's shadow rapporteur on the accession of Serbia to the European Union. In addition to his committee assignments, he is part of the Parliament's delegation to the EU-Serbia Stabilisation and Association Parliamentary Committee and the European Parliament Intergroup on Western Sahara.

References

Living people
1976 births
MEPs for Slovenia 2019–2024
Academic staff of the University of Ljubljana